Lester John Backman (March 20, 1888 – November 8, 1975) was a Major League Baseball pitcher who played for two seasons. He pitched for the St. Louis Cardinals for 21 games during the 1909 St. Louis Cardinals season and 26 games during the 1910 St. Louis Cardinals season.

He made his debut game in the Major League at the age of 21 on July 3, 1909. He played his last game at the age of 22 on August 28, 1910.

References

External links

1888 births
1975 deaths
Major League Baseball pitchers
Baseball players from Ohio
Rose–Hulman Fightin' Engineers baseball players
St. Louis Cardinals players
Troy Trojans (minor league) players
Toronto Maple Leafs (International League) players
Syracuse Stars (minor league baseball) players
People from Cleves, Ohio